Jalalabad Gas Field is a natural gas field at Sylhet, Bangladesh. It is a subsidiary of Chevron (Bangladesh), a leading US multinational company in the oil and gas sector.

Location
Jalalabad gas field is located in the Lakkartura tea estate area of Sylhet.

Discovery
Jalalabad gas field was discovered by an international oil company, Symeter, in 1989.

Excavations and wells
At Jalalabad gas field, gas is being extracted through three wells namely Block-14-A JB-6, JB-7 and JB-9.

See also 
 List of natural gas fields in Bangladesh
 Bangladesh Gas Fields Company Limited
 Gas Transmission Company Limited

References

1989 establishments in Bangladesh
Economy of Sylhet
Natural gas fields in Bangladesh